Pachymerium ferrugineum is a species of centipede in the family Geophilidae that can be found in Central Europe, the Iberian Peninsula, Scandinavia, Asian countries such as Japan and Turkey, and on African islands such as the Azores, Canary Islands and Crete. It is also distributed in Alaska and Mexico.

Research 
The number of legs varies widely in this species, ranging from as few as 41 pairs in Northern Europe to as many as 69 pairs in Palestine. Various studies have been done on the intraspecific variation of Pachymerium ferrugineum to show the significance of the species geographical location to their number of leg-bearing segments.  One study published in the Biological Journal of the Linnean Society showed that these species exhibit more leg-bearing segments in Southern geographical locations versus the Northern regions in North-west Europe.  A study conducted in the Aegean region has shown that the leg-bearing segments of Pachymerium ferrugineum in the Cyclades possibly vary due to insular characteristics of the island.

Ecology
The species is terrestrial that can be found on White Sea seashore.

References

Further reading
 
 
 
 

Geophilomorpha
Animals described in 1835
Arthropods of Asia
Arthropods of Africa
Myriapods of Europe